Harumi Hiroyama (born 2 September 1968 in Naruto, Tokushima) is a Japanese long-distance runner. In her early career she specialized in the 1500 and 3000 metres, but gradually she shifted to the 5000 metres, 10,000 metres and the marathon race.

She won her first marathon in 2006 at the age of 37 when she beat Yoko Shibui to the finish to win the Nagoya International Women's Marathon.

Achievements

Personal bests
1500 metres - 4:11.10 min (1994)
3000 metres - 8:50.40 min (1994)
5000 metres - 15:03.67 min (1998)
10,000 metres - 31:22.72 min (1997)
Marathon - 2:22:56 hrs (2000)

References

External links

1968 births
Living people
Sportspeople from Tokushima Prefecture
Japanese female long-distance runners
Japanese female marathon runners
Olympic female long-distance runners
Olympic athletes of Japan
Athletes (track and field) at the 1996 Summer Olympics
Athletes (track and field) at the 2000 Summer Olympics
Athletes (track and field) at the 2004 Summer Olympics
Asian Games silver medalists for Japan
Asian Games medalists in athletics (track and field)
Athletes (track and field) at the 1994 Asian Games
Athletes (track and field) at the 2002 Asian Games
Medalists at the 1994 Asian Games
Medalists at the 2002 Asian Games
Japan Championships in Athletics winners
20th-century Japanese women
21st-century Japanese women